Catalin Sebastian Drăguceanu (born November 19, 1970) in Mediaș, is a former Romanian rugby union football player. He played as a Number Eight. He was the Captain of Romanian Rugby Union team. Played for the Rugby Union World Cup in 1995.

Club career
He mostly played for Steaua during his career. He also played for West Club Brisbane in Australia.

International career
Drăguceanu gathered 35 caps for Romania, from his debut in 1994 to his last game in 2000. He scored 4 tries during his international career, 20 points on aggregate. He was a member of his national side for the 3rd and 4th  Rugby World Cups in 1995 and 1999.

References

External links

1970 births
Living people
Romanian rugby union players
Romania international rugby union players
Rugby union number eights
CSA Steaua București (rugby union) players
People from Mediaș